Looking Back with Love is the debut album by American musician Mike Love of the Beach Boys, released in 1981 by Boardwalk Records. Produced by Curt Boettcher, the album includes a mix of covers and originals.

Songs
The lyrics to the title track were written by Love's manager, Dan Parker.

"On and On and On" is a cover of an ABBA song which was itself influenced by the 1968 Beach Boys song "Do It Again".

Love's cover of "Be My Baby" originates from July 1980 sessions produced by his Beach Boys bandmate and cousin Brian Wilson. However, the released track features additional overdubs and production completed without Wilson, and Curt Boettcher receives the sole production credit.

Reception
The Rolling Stone Album Guide called the album "notable only for its title track: an egregious 'salute' to those crazy ol' '60s that would probably make a dandy Republican campaign jingle."

Track listing

References

1981 debut albums
Mike Love albums
Albums produced by Curt Boettcher